The Broderick–Terry duel (subsequently called "the last notable American duel") was fought between United States Senator David C. Broderick, of California, and ex-Chief Justice David S. Terry, of the Supreme Court of California, on September 13, 1859. The two men had been friends and political allies within the Democratic Party. However, Broderick was an abolitionist, whereas Terry was pro-slavery. Intense political disagreements led to bitter resentments, which in turn led to a challenge to a duel and the fatal encounter in a ravine near Lake Merced in San Francisco.

Not long after the duel, both public opinion and legislation turned strongly against the custom of duelling.  not all of the U.S. states have laws that specifically ban duelling. The site of the duel is now a registered California Historical Landmark.

Background
Broderick and Terry both belonged to the Democratic Party, and were originally good friends. Broderick had said of Terry that he considered him to be "the only honest man on the Supreme bench". And on one occasion, Broderick was the only person who did not turn his back on Terry in his time of need.

That all changed after Terry failed to be re-elected. He believed that this loss occurred because of Broderick's antislavery campaign against the faction of the party to which Terry belonged. Conversely, Broderick blamed Terry's faction of the party for trying to bring him down. Various accusations and counter-accusations followed, in one of which Broderick said

I see that Terry has been abusing me. I now take back the remark I once made that he is the only honest judge in the Supreme Court. I was his friend when he was in need of friends, for which I am sorry. Had the vigilance committee disposed of him as they did of others, they would have done a righteous act.

The situation between the two men worsened when Terry attempted to be renominated as a Supreme Court Justice, but was denied the nomination because of Broderick's efforts towards the Lecompton Constitution. In a fiery speech which Terry gave in Sacramento in June 1859, he accused the convention delegates of following the orders of their "master" Broderick.

Two days later Broderick found out about the speech and reacted by calling Terry a "damned miserable ingrate", and adding that he doubted Terry's honesty. Broderick's remarks were overheard by a Mr. D. W. Perley, who later told Terry about them. Terry was clearly hurt by what he considered to be a betrayal by a man he had helped so much in the past.

After Broderick lost an election to U. S. Senator William M. Gwin, Terry wrote a letter to Broderick which was in fact a challenge to fight a duel:

After a few clarifications on what in particular Terry found to be offensive in his statements, Broderick agreed that it was Terry's call to decide whether those statements were offensive. Terry insisted on his interpretation of Broderick's statements, and the duel was scheduled.

The first attempt to stage the duel was made a few days before September 13. This first attempt failed because of police intervention. Both Terry and Broderick agreed to make another attempt, and the location for the duel was moved to a secluded area near Lake Merced. The day was set for September 13. The weapons chosen were Belgian .58 caliber pistols. Terry was familiar with that model of pistol and had practiced with one before the duel, whereas Broderick did not.

As it was described later, "Both pistols had hair triggers, but Broderick's was more delicately set than Terry's, so much so that a jar might discharge it. Broderick's seconds were inexperienced men, and no one realized the importance of this difference."

In 1881, James O'Meara provided an eyewitness account of the duel. He wrote concerning Broderick:

After Broderick was wounded and fell to the ground, one of the spectators tried to charge at Terry with a pistol. The spectator's name was Davis, and he claimed to be Broderick's friend. He was outraged by what he had interpreted as a murder.

Broderick had indeed been seriously wounded, and fought for his life for three days. He died at 9:20 a.m. on September 16, 1859.

One of Broderick's last pronouncements was: "They have killed me because I was opposed to slavery and a corrupt administration."

Funeral of Broderick
After his violent death, Broderick was treated as a hero and a martyr for his cause - the fight against slavery. His funeral became one of the most prominent demonstrations of public support that the city of San Francisco had ever seen. He was buried at Lone Mountain Cemetery.

Arrest and trial of Terry
Captain of Detectives I. W. Lees and Detective H. H. Ellis proceeded to Terry's home with a warrant against him. Ellis described the arrest:

Commemoration

On June 1, 1932, the site of the duel was registered as California Registered Historical Landmark number 19, and in 1949, marker 19 was erected at the beginning of the trail that leads to the site. The marker was erected by the California Centennial Commission, County Board of Supervisors, and the San Mateo County Historical Association. There is also a directional obelisk which points towards the site of the duel. At the site itself, two more granite obelisks, each one engraved with the name of one of the combatants, mark the places where Broderick and Terry stood, 10 yards apart. The landmark and duel site is located at 1100 Lake Merced Boulevard, San Francisco, CA, 94015.

California later passed laws against dueling, with enhanced punishment if the duel resulted in death.  On November 25, 1998, the pistols that were used in the duel were sold at auction in San Francisco for $34,500.

References

1859 in California
1859 in American politics
September 1859 events
1859 crimes in the United States
Dueling
History of San Mateo County, California
Crimes in the San Francisco Bay Area